Neuberger is a surname of German origin. It may refer to:
Albert Neuberger (1908–1996), British academic, member of the Royal Society
Alex Neuberger (b. 1992), American actor
David Neuberger, Baron Neuberger of Abbotsbury (b. 1948), British judge, barrister
Günther Neuberger (contemporary), German Olympic bobsledder
Herman N. Neuberger (1918–2005), German-American Orthodox rabbi
James Neuberger (b. 1949), British physician, professor of medicine, and journal editor
Julia Neuberger, Baroness Neuberger (b. 1950), British rabbi, social reformer, and Member of the House of Lords
Leah Neuberger (1915–1993), American champion table tennis player
Maurine Brown Neuberger (1907–2000), American politician from Oregon; U.S. Senator 1960–67
Michael Neuberger (1953-2013), British biochemist and immunologist
Richard L. Neuberger (1912–1960), American journalist, author, and politician from Oregon
Roy Neuberger (1903-2010), American financier and art patron
Samuel Neuberger, American attorney
Sigmund Neuberger (1872–1911), German illusionist (magician) known as The Great Lafayette
Willi Neuberger (b. 1946), German professional football player